Kimberly Smith (born 21 August 1985) is a former female rugby union player. She was part of the Black Ferns squad that won the 2006 Rugby World Cup in Canada.

Smith has also represented New Zealand in Volleyball both at national and international level. She captained the Christchurch-based volleyball club, the Shirley Silverbacks, when they won the NZ Women's Volleyball League competition in 2015.

In 2019, Smith was named as captain of the New Zealand women's volleyball team in a series against Australia.

References

External links
Black Ferns Profile

1985 births
Living people
New Zealand women's international rugby union players
New Zealand female rugby union players
Female rugby union players